Monte Carlo is a 1926 American silent romantic comedy film directed by Christy Cabanne and starring Lew Cody. It was produced by and distributed through MGM.

Synopsis
An American adventurer hides from pursuing detectives in the hotel room of a young schoolteacher.

Cast
 Lew Cody as Tony Townsend 
 Gertrude Olmstead as Sally Roxford 
 Roy D'Arcy as  Prince Boris 
 Karl Dane as The Doorman 
 ZaSu Pitts as Hope Durant 
 Trixie Friganza as Flossie Payne 
 Margaret Campbell as Grand Duchess Marie 
 André Lanoy as Ludvig 
 Max Barwyn as Sarleff 
 Barbara Shears as Princess Ilene 
 Harry Myers as Greves 
 Cesare Gravina as Count Davigny 
 Tony D'Algy as Varo 
 Arthur Hoyt as Bancroft

Preservation status
The film is preserved in the MGM library.

References

External links

1926 films
Films directed by Christy Cabanne
Metro-Goldwyn-Mayer films
American silent feature films
American black-and-white films
American romantic comedy-drama films
1920s romantic comedy-drama films
1926 comedy films
1926 drama films
1920s American films
Silent romantic comedy-drama films
Silent American comedy-drama films
1920s English-language films